The 2022 Minnesota Golden Gophers football team represented the University of Minnesota during the 2022 NCAA Division I FBS football season. The Golden Gophers played their home games at Huntington Bank Stadium in Minneapolis, Minnesota, and competed as members of the Big Ten Conference. They were led by head coach P. J. Fleck, in his sixth season.

Offseason

2022 recruiting class

Roster

Schedule
Minnesota announced its 2022 football schedule on January 12, 2022. The 2022 schedule will consist of seven home games and five away games in the regular season. The Gophers will host Big Ten foes Purdue, Rutgers, Northwestern, and Iowa and will travel to Michigan State, Illinois, Penn State, Nebraska, and Wisconsin.

The Golden Gophers will host all of the three non-conference opponents, New Mexico State from the FBS Independents, Western Illinois from Division I FCS and Colorado from the Pac-12.

Game summaries

New Mexico State

Western Illinois

Colorado

at Michigan State

Purdue

at No. 24 Illinois

at No. 16 Penn State

Rutgers

at Nebraska

Northwestern

Iowa

at Wisconsin

vs. Syracuse (Pinstripe Bowl)

Rankings

References

Minnesota
Minnesota Golden Gophers football seasons
Pinstripe Bowl champion seasons
Minnesota Golden Gophers football